Old Telly Time: The Clock Who Stopped to Rest is an illustrated children's book written by Linda A. McRae and illustrated by L. A. McRae and Z. A. McRae.

It was first written in 1980 and originally published in Australia in 1982.

References

Australian children's books
1980 children's books
Australian picture books